Golden River may refer to:


Rivers
 Golden River (Anchuhu), a former Jurchen name for the Ashi River, China
 Golden River or Golden Water River, in the outer court of the Forbidden City, Beijing, China
 Golden River (Ah-ur-tan), a former Mongolian name for the Yellow River, China
 Do Ouro River (disambiguation) or Golden River, several rivers in Brazil
 Douro, nicknamed Golden River, in Spain and Portugal
 Mas River, East Java, Indonesia
 Zarrineh River, Iran

Culture
 The Golden River (album), 2003 album by Frog Eyes
 "The Golden River" (comics), 1957 comic book story
 The Golden River, a children's game also known as May I Cross Your Golden River
 The King of the Golden River, 1841 book by John Ruskin
 Three Golden Rivers, 1948 young-adult novel by Olive Price

Other uses
 Golden Rivers Football League, Australia

See also
 Gold River (disambiguation)